Marco Antonio Garcés Ramírez (born 7 November 1972) is a Mexican former professional footballer who played as a midfielder.

Career statistics

Club

International

International goals
Scores and results list Mexico's goal tally first.

References

1972 births
Living people
Mexican footballers
Mexico international footballers
Association football midfielders
Cruz Azul footballers
Tecos F.C. footballers
C.D. Guadalajara footballers
C.F. Pachuca players
Liga MX players
Footballers from Mexico City